Gaston Gerald (born October 20, 1931) is an American former politician from the state of Louisiana who served in the Louisiana Senate.

Gerald served on the Baton Rouge City-Parish Council from 1965 to 1972 representing Ward II. He succeeded council member W.W. Dumas upon Dumas' election as mayor-president. In 1972, he was elected to the Louisiana State Senate to represent district 13. In 1979, Gerald was convicted on charges of attempted extortion of a contractor relating to the construction of the Baton Rouge Civic Center and was imprisoned at Federal Correctional Institution, Fort Worth, in Texas. He was expelled from the State Senate in 1981 on a 33-3 vote, the only senator in the history of the institution to have been expelled.

References

1931 births
Politicians from Baton Rouge, Louisiana
Businesspeople from Louisiana
Democratic Party Louisiana state senators
Louisiana local politicians
Farmers from Louisiana
Ranchers from Louisiana
Prisoners and detainees of the United States federal government
American politicians convicted of bribery
Living people
Place of birth missing (living people)
Louisiana politicians convicted of crimes